The Culture of Saint Lucia blends the influences of African, French, and English heritage. The official language of the island is English but Kreole, a form of French patois, remains an influential secondary language.  The people are predominantly Catholic but the religious climate is tolerant.

Festivals
Saint Lucia holds every year two main traditional festivals, La Woz ("The Rose", on August 30) and La Magwit ("The Marguerite", on October 17), organized by the two rival historic cultural associations (societés) with the same names whose affiliates comprise most of the country's population.

The Christmas season is celebrated and a number of small festivals and parades take place throughout the island.

Saint Lucia also celebrates a cultural festival known as Creole Day (Jounen Kwéyòl). This is celebrated each year on the last Sunday of October. On the Sunday of this week, the various towns chosen to host this festival  put out the result of their grand preparations; local foods and drinks such as breadfruit, green fig, plantain, salt fish, king fish, manicou (opossum), roast pork, Johnny Cake (fried bake) and a famous dish, bouyon (fish, chicken or meat stewed with dasheen, yams, plantains, banana and dumplings), lime drinks, guava drinks and more. Most people commemorate this day by wearing the island's national wear known as the Madras. Persons who do not want to wear the extreme layers of skirts and dresses make clothing out of the special plaid material.

Secular observances include an internationally renowned Jazz Festival. Beginning in 1991, this annual festival draws crowds of music-lovers from around the world.

Music

The musical culture of Saint Lucia includes an indigenous folk music tradition, as well as other Caribbean music genres such as Calypso, soca, zouk and reggae. Saint Lucia produces very high quantities of zouk music. Modern Saint Lucia today has produced artists/producers such as  Mecca, Teddyson John, Ricky T, Claudia Edwards, Shemmy J just to name a few.

Cuisine

St Lucia's national dish is green banana and saltfish. 

The Island's Cuisine is a unique blend of West African, European (mainly British and French) and East Indian cuisine this creates dynamic meal dishes such as Macaroni pie, Stew chicken, rice and peas, hearty fish broths or fish water, hearty soups packed full with fresh locally produced vegetables. St Lucian cuisine is similar to many other commonwealth Caribbean nations such as Dominica, Jamaica Neighboring St Vincent and Trinidad. Typical essential food stuff are potatoes, onions, celery, thyme, coconut milk, the very hot scotch bonnet peppers, flour and cornmeal. All mainstream meat and poultry are eaten in St Lucia meat and seafood are normally stewed and browned to create a rich gravy sometimes served over ground provisions or rice.
Due to St Lucia's East Indian influenced by its small Indo-Caribbean population, curry is very popular. However, due to the blend of between cooking styles, curry dishes have a distant Caribbean twist to it. In recent years, roti, a flatbread of Indian origin, has become very popular being imported from the twin island nation of Trinidad and Tobago to the south. This bread is typically served as a fast food snack. The bread itself is very flat (sometimes very thin) and is wrapped around curried vegetables such as chickpeas, potatoes, or meat.

Literature
Derek Walcott is the most prominent St. Lucian writer, Nobel Prize winner in 1992.

Art
Dr The Honourable Bongskie Agno, renowned St. Lucian artist, was knighted in the 2009/2010 New Year's honours list, for his services to art. The investiture ceremony was held on 9 April 2010, at Government House where the Governor General on the advice of Her Majesty the Queen, invested Sir Dunstan St. Omer with the Insignia of a Knight Commander of the Order of St Michael and St George (KCMG). The UK Telegraph has described him as “the Michelangelo of the Caribbean”. Designer of the St Lucian flag. In 2007 the Folk Research Centre declared him a National Cultural Hero. Born in Castries, on October 24, 1927. Died, aged 87, on May 5, 2015.

Carnival
Traditionally, in common with other Caribbean countries, Saint Lucia held a carnival before Lent. In 1999, it was moved to mid-July so as not to clash with the much larger Trinidad and Tobago carnival, and in effort to attract more overseas visitors. It is a two-day festival where people walk about two miles. Before carnival, there is a competition among women in the country to find the queen of carnival.

Sport

Another popular sport in Saint Lucia is Football. Football played all over the island as well as cricket.
Darren Sammy is the former captain of the west Indies Cricket team.

External links
  Code of Etiquette for the use of the National Flag of Saint Lucia
 Biography available in The Designers (Saint Lucia National Symbols)
 St. Lucia Jazz - Official site by St. Lucia Tourist Board
 St. Lucia Folk Research Center
 LucianCarnival.com - Official website of Saint Lucia Carnival
 Luigi St Omer - Web site of the most prominent St. Lucian painter Luigi St Omer